Two ships of the Royal Australian Navy have been named HMAS Whyalla, for the city of Whyalla, South Australia

 , a Bathurst-class corvette launched in 1941, decommissioned in 1946, operated as a Victorian Public Works lighthouse tender until 1984, and preserved as a landlocked museum ship
 , a Fremantle-class patrol boat launched in 1982, and decommissioned in 2005

Battle honours
Ships named HMAS Whyalla are entitled to carry three battle honours:
Pacific 1942–45
New Guinea 1942–44
Okinawa 1945

References

Royal Australian Navy ship names